Hadji Mohammad Ajul, officially the Municipality of Hadji Mohammad Ajul (Tausūg: Lupah Hadji Mohammad Ajul; Chavacano: Municipalidad de Hadji Mohammad Ajul), is a  municipality in the province of Basilan, Philippines. According to the 2020 census, it has a population of 24,625 people.

It was created by Muslim Mindanao Autonomy Act No. 192, ratified by plebiscite on May 22, 2006. It is composed of 11 barangays that were formerly part of Tuburan.

Geography

Barangays
Hadji Mohammad Ajul is politically subdivided into 11 barangays.

Climate

Demographics

In the 2020 census, Hadji Mohammad Ajul had a population of 24,625.

Economy

References

External links
Hadji Mohammad Ajul Profile at the DTI Cities and Municipalities Competitive Index
[ Philippine Standard Geographic Code]

Municipalities of Basilan